Men Are Like That is a 1930 American pre-Code drama film directed by Frank Tuttle and written by Herman J. Mankiewicz and Marion Dix, based on the George Kelly play The Show-Off, which had already been the source material for a 1926 silent film and which would subsequently be remade in 1934 and 1946. Men Are Like That stars Hal Skelly, Doris Hill, Clara Blandick, Charles Sellon, Helene Chadwick, Morgan Farley and George Fawcett. The film was released on March 22, 1930, by Paramount Pictures.

Cast
Hal Skelly	as J. Aubrey Piper
Doris Hill as Amy Fisher
Clara Blandick as Ma Fisher
Charles Sellon as Pa Fisher
Helene Chadwick as Clara Hyland
Morgan Farley as Joe Fisher
George Fawcett as The Judge
William B. Davidson as Frank Hyland
Eugene Pallette as Traffic Cop

Preservation status
 It is preserved in the Library of Congress collection.

References

External links 
 

1930 films
1930s English-language films
American drama films
1930 drama films
Paramount Pictures films
Films directed by Frank Tuttle
American black-and-white films
1930s American films